"Haunting, Haunted, Haunts" is a song by the punk rock band Against Me!. It was the second song unveiled before the release of their seventh album Shape Shift With Me on August 10, 2016.

The song was released as part of the 2016 installment of the Adult Swim Singles Program.

Personnel
 Laura Jane Grace – guitar, vocals 
 James Bowman – guitar, backing vocals 
 Inge Johansson – bass guitar, backing vocals 
 Atom Willard – drums, percussion

References

2016 songs
Against Me! songs
Songs written by Laura Jane Grace
Songs written by James Bowman (musician)
Songs written by Inge Johansson
Songs written by Atom Willard